This is a list of churches, cathedrals and chapels in Bucharest.

Protestant Churches

Catholic Churches

Orthodox Churches

Oriental Orthodox Churches

 
churches in Bucharest
Bucharest
Churches